The Stettler Lightning are a Junior "B" Ice Hockey team based in Stettler, Alberta, Canada. They are members of the North Division of the Heritage Junior B Hockey League (HJHL). They play their home games at Stettler Recreation Centre. Occasionally the Lightning play home games at the Big Valley Agriplex in Big Valley, Alberta.

Season-by-season record 

Note: GP = Games played, W = Wins, L = Losses, T = Ties, OTL = Overtime Losses, Pts = Points, GF = Goals for, GA = Goals against, PIM = Penalties in minutes

Russ Barnes Trophy
Alberta Jr. B Provincial Championships

See also
List of ice hockey teams in Alberta

External links
Official website of the Stettler Lightning

Ice hockey teams in Alberta